DeShawn is a first name, common among the African-American community. The name adds the French prefix "de-" to the name Shawn.

DeShawn may refer to:

 Deshawn L. Parker (born 1971), American horse racing jockey
 DeShawn Shead (born 1989), American National Football League player
 DeShawn Sims (born 1988), basketball player
 DeShawn Snow, one of The Real Housewives of Atlanta (season 1)
 DeShawn Stevenson (born 1981), American former National Basketball Association player
 DeShawn Williams (born 1992), American National Football League player
 DeShawn Wynn (born 1983), American former National Football League player

See also
 Deshaun, another given name

English-language masculine given names